Melakkal is a village in Madurai district, Tamil Nadu, India, where the grave of Varushai Syed Ibrahim Waliullah is found.

Demographics
Melakkal is a village surrounded by Nagamalai hills in the north, Vaigai river in the south.

Kanavai Dargha 
Varushai Syed Ibraheem Shaheed Waliullah is the descendant of Sulthan Syed Ibrahim Shahhed Badusha Nayagam of Erwadi. He is the grandfather of Mursal Ibrahim Shaheed, whose dargah is located in Thachu oorani near Mayakulam, between Kilakkarai and Ervadi in the East Coast Road. Thus he is the great-grandfather of Nalla Ibrahim Waliyullah whose is the forefather of all the levvai mujavirs (huqdhars) of Erwadi dargah. The dargah of Nalla Ibrahim (who is actually named Muhammad Ibraim) is located Erwadi main dargah campus.

Villages in Madurai district
Dargahs in India
Sufi shrines in India
Ziyarat
Tourist attractions in Madurai
Dargahs in Tamil Nadu
Erwadi-related dargahs